The General Land Office was an independent agency of the United States government responsible for public domain lands in the United States. It was created in 1812, and it merged with the United States Grazing Service in 1946 to become the Bureau of Land Management. The official in charge of the agency was called the Commissioner of the General Land Office, appointed by the President and confirmed by the Senate.

References

Defunct agencies of the United States government